In Dzogchen, rainbow body
(Jalü or Jalus) is a level of realization. This may or may not be accompanied by the 'rainbow body phenomenon'. The rainbow body phenomenon is pre-Buddhist in origin, and is a topic which has been treated fairly seriously in Tibet for centuries past and into the modern era. Other Vajrayana teachings also mention rainbow body phenomena.

Rigpa

The rainbow body phenomenon is a third person perspective of someone else attaining complete knowledge. Knowledge is the absence of delusion regarding the display of the basis.

Rigpa has three wisdoms, which are kadag, lhun grub and thugs rje. Kadag deals with trekchö. The lhun grub aspect has to do with esoteric practices, such as (but not limited to) tögal, that self-liberate the human body into a Sambhogakāya (rainbow body phenomenon). The symbol of Dzogchen is a Tibetan "A" wrapped in a thigle. The "A" represents kadag while the thigle represents lhun grub. The third wisdom, thugs rje (compassion), is the inseparability of the previous two wisdoms.

In Dzogchen, a fundamental point of practice is to distinguish rigpa from sems (mind).

The ultimate fruition of the tögal practices is a body of pure light and the dissolution of the physical body at death, this is called a rainbow body (Wylie  'ja' lus, pronounced ja lü.) If the four visions of tögal are not completed before death, then during death, from the point of view of an external observer, the dying person starts to shrink until he or she disappears. Usually fingernails, toenails and hair are left behind (see e.g. Togden Ugyen Tendzin, Ayu Khandro, Changchub Dorje). The attainment of the rainbow body is typically accompanied by the appearance of lights and rainbows.

Exceptional practitioners are held to realize a higher type of rainbow body without dying, a state named the Rainbow Body of Great Transference, or jalu powa chemo. Having completed the four visions before death, the individual focuses on the lights that surround the fingers. His or her physical body self-liberates into a non-material body of light  (a Sambhogakāya) with the ability to exist and abide wherever and whenever as pointed by one's compassion.

Eyewitness account
Shardza Tashi Gyaltsen's Heart Drops of Dharmakaya, a Kunzang Nyingtik Dzogchen meditation manual commentated on by Lopon Tenzin Namdak, contains an eyewitness account of his main students' bodies shrinking and rainbows appearing in the sky at death.

Reported accomplishments
 Shardza Tashi Gyaltsen (1935)
 Sodnam Namgyal (1952)
 Ayu Khandro (1953)
 Togden Ugyen Tendzin (1962)
 Khenpo A-chos (1998)

Notes

References

Further reading

External links
Account of Khenpo A-Cho's Rainbow body attainment archived

Dzogchen
Dzogchen practices
Tantric practices
Tibetan Buddhist practices
Tibetan mythology